Malar is a town in the Awaran District of Balochistan province, Pakistan. It is located at 26°19'48N 64°55'10E and has an altitude of 548 metres (1801 feet).

References

Populated places in Awaran District